Andray is a given name. Notable people with the name include:

 Andray Baptiste (born 1977), Grenadian footballer
 Andray Blatche (born 1986), American-Filipino basketball player